Below is a partial list of notable Liberian people.

B

 Nathaniel Barnes (born 1954), politician
 Joseph Bartuah, journalist
 Martha Sandolo Belleh
 Moses Zeh Blah
 John Bernard Blamo
 Joseph Nyumah Boakai (born 1944), Vice President of Liberia
 Angie Elisabeth Brooks
 Charles Walker Brumskine
 Gyude Bryant

C

 Monie Captan
 Alvin Chea
 Chea Cheapoo
 Sekou Damate Conneh
 Al-Hassan Conteh
 Helene Cooper, journalist
 Alexander B Cummings Jr.
 Rennie Curran

D
 Roland Tombekai Dempster, writer
 Charles Cecil Dennis
 Roland Diggs
 Alvin Swen Dixon (born 1993), international footballer
 Nancy Doe
 Samuel Kanyon Doe
 Enoch Dogolea
 Abdullah Dukuly
 Momolu Dukuly
 Cheryl Dunye

E
 Ernest Eastman

F
 Henry Boimah Fahnbulleh
 Michael Kpakala Francis
 Comfort Freeman

G

 James Edward Greene
 Joseph Rudolph Grimes (1923-2007), lawyer and statesman

H

 Musue Noha Haddad
 Tamba Hali (born 1983), American football linebacker
 Sumowood Harris
Othello Hunter (born 1986), basketball player in the Israeli Basketball Premier League

J
 Collins John, footballer
 Dulee Johnson, footballer
 Wesley Momo Johnson
 Amymusu Jones, judge
 Bhawoh Jue

K
 Abu Kanneh
 Francis Kateh
 George Klay Kieh
 Olubanke King-Akerele
 Kafumba Konneh
 David Kpormakor
 Robert Kpoto
 G. V. Kromah

L
 Benjamin Dorme Lartey

M

Emmanuel B. Matadi
Gabriel Baccus Matthews
Harry Fumba Moniba
 Bai T.J. Moore
 Lafayette K. Morgan
 Samuel C. Morrison, Jr.

P
 Dawn Padmore (born 1967), singer
 Ruth Perry
 James A. A. Pierre

R

 Joe Ragland (born 1989), American-Liberian basketball player for Hapoel Holon of the Israeli Basketball Premier League
 Jane Roberts
 Joseph Jenkins Roberts
 Tecumsay Roberts

S
 Elias Saleeby, banker
 Wilton Sankawulo
 Amos Sawyer
 Antoinette Sayeh
 Ophelia Hoff Saytumah
 Ellen Johnson Sirleaf
 Momolu Sirleaf
 Jeremiah Sulunteh

T

 Charles Ghankay Taylor
 Togba-Nah Tipoteh
 Victoria Tolbert
 William Richard Tolbert
 Antoinette Tubman
 William Vacanarat Shadrach Tubman
 Winston Tubman
 Sultan Tucker

V
 Jerome Verdier

W
 George Wallace
 Bennie Warner
 George Weah
 Rocheforte Lafayette Weeks
 Henry Too Wesley
 Izetta Sombo Wesley
 Dioh Williams
 Samuel Kofi Woods
 Cletus Segbe Wotorson
 Joe Woyee
 Christopher Wreh

People